Phoenix High School is an open-campus public high school in Gwinnett County, Georgia, a suburb north of Atlanta, and a part of the Gwinnett County Public School System, in Lawrenceville, Georgia, United States.

Phoenix offers childcare for parents who wish to attend class. The school does not offer extra-curricular activities.  The school's website states that this allows students to better focus on academics.

References

External links
 Phoenix High School's website

Educational institutions in the United States with year of establishment missing
Public high schools in Georgia (U.S. state)
Schools in Gwinnett County, Georgia